Behavioral Public Administration (BPA) is the study of psychological methods and findings in political administrative settings, that is, cognitive and decision biases and discriminations by bureaucrats, the interaction between citizens and bureaucrats, and the psychological effects of public service failure. 

It is the study of behaviors and methodology for administrative purposes. It attempts to better understand the cycle of causes and consequences after putting orders or laws into motion to govern or administrate one or many humans within a specific group. It is an interdisciplinary academic discipline that studies public administration "from the micro-level perspective of individual and group behavior and attitudes."

Components of study
Behavioral public administration has three main components:
 It uses individuals and groups of citizens, employees, and managers within the public sector as units of analysis (or the framework in which the analysis will be conducted).
 It emphasizes the behavior and attitudes of these groups.
 It integrates insights from psychology and the behavioral sciences to study public administration. 

The behavioral approach to public administration complements traditional public administration research, adding the ability to make more detailed theories in addition to the previously dominant big-picture theories of public administration. It uses theories and methods from psychology to study the attitudes and behaviors of citizens, public professionals, and public managers. By drawing on these insights, the approach attempts to improve knowledge and the skill of practitioners in public administration and academia. 

For example, the behavioral approach's use of psychology could shed light on improving citizens’ perceptions of performance. In another example, the addition of psychology can help find to what extent nudging works efficiently as a policy tool. This makes the behavioral approach very beneficial to policy-makers and public officials. The integration of public administration and psychology can also benefit psychologists, by offering insights into how theories developed in controlled environments hold up when tested in complex public environments.

History and development 
The growing prevalence of research at the intersection of psychology and public administration led to the creation of the Journal of Behavioral Public Administration, which published its first issue in 2018. The journal, edited by professors Sebastian Jilke, Joanna Lahey, Kenneth J. Meier, and William G. Resh, is dedicated to behavioral and experimental research in public administration.

The trend of behavioral research within public administration can be traced back to scholars such as Herbert A. Simon. In his book Administrative Behavior: A Study of Decision-Making Processes in Administrative Organization, Simon asserts that "decision-making is the heart of the administration, and that the vocabulary of administrative theory must be derived from the logic and psychology of human choice." Other public administration scholars have also argued for a tighter connection between the fields of psychology and public administration.

Some of the leading research studies on BPA are Performance information in politics: How framing, format, and rhetoric matter to politicians’ preferences (2019) by Martin Bækgaard, Street-Level Bureaucrats as Individual Policymakers: The Relationship between Attitudes and Coping Behavior toward Vulnerable Children and Youth (2017) by Siddhartha Baviskar and Søren C. Winter, and The Creativity of Coping: Alternative Tales of Moral Dilemmas among Migration Control Officers (2018)  by Lisa Marie Borrelli and Annika Lindberg.  

Although it is growing in prevalence, psychological methods and theories in the field of public administration are still not applied as often as in other disciplines, such as economics, political science, and management studies. In these fields of research, psychology-informed sub-fields have emerged, for example, political psychology, behavioral economics, and industrial and organizational psychology.

While the number of psychology-informed research studies in public administration might be small, the number is increasing. Public administration scholars have begun incorporating theories from the field of psychology into the study of public leadership and public service motivation, transparency, public service competition, public choice, blame avoidance among policymakers, performance information, and trust of civil servants. The methods and measurement techniques used to study public administration have, to an increasing extent, become influenced by the practices of the psychological field, most notably seen as in the more frequent use of experiments.

References

External links 
Journal of Behavioral Public Administration.
List of scholars of Behavioral Public Administration at Google Scholar.
EGPA Permanent Study Group on Behavioral Public Administration.

Public administration